FTZ stands for Free trade zone. It may also refer to:

Foreign trade zone
FTZ 1 TR 6, German national digital signalling protocol formerly used for ISDN
ftz instability element; see FIE3 (ftz instability element 3') element
Flush-to-zero; see Denormal number
Fushi tarazu; see Pair-rule gene